Roman Viktorovich Savchenko (born July 28, 1988) is a Kazakhstani professional ice hockey defenceman who currently plays for Barys Nur-Sultan of the Kontinental Hockey League (KHL).

Playing career
Having played with his native club, Barys Astana, since the inception of the KHL, Savchenko left as a free agent following his 10th season with the club in 2017–18. He opted to continue in the KHL, agreeing to a one-year contract with Russian outfit, HC Sibir Novosibirsk on 23 August 2018.

After one season with Sibir, Savchenko left as a free agent to sign a one-year contract with Lokomotiv Yaroslavl on 14 May 2019.

Savchenko played two seasons with Lokomotiv Yaroslavl before returning to Barys as a free agent on a one-year contract on 13 July 2021.

Career statistics

Regular season and playoffs

International

References

External links

1988 births
Asian Games gold medalists for Kazakhstan
Asian Games medalists in ice hockey
Barys Nur-Sultan players
Kazakhstani ice hockey defencemen
Kazakhstani people of Russian descent
Kazzinc-Torpedo players
Living people
Lokomotiv Yaroslavl players
Medalists at the 2011 Asian Winter Games
Sportspeople from Oskemen
HC Sibir Novosibirsk players
Ice hockey players at the 2011 Asian Winter Games